Black Creek is a community on the eastern side of Vancouver Island, British Columbia, Canada. It is part of Electoral Area C in the Comox Valley Regional District.

History 
Black Creek was the host to several logging camps in the early years of the 20th century such as the Comox Logging & Railway Camp #3 which was on what is now Endall Road. Endall Road public easement joins the dead end road with Hamm Road. Part of the camp bunkhouse is now adjoined to a local estate home. The area was made available to German speaking Mennonite settlers primarily from the USSR via Mexico or the Canadian Prairie provinces in the 1930s. They left a legacy of hard work, wresting dairy and fruit growing farms from stony ground that had once boasted some of the largest Douglas firs in the world. It is still evident today in the many small but beautiful gardens and farms that line the Old Island Highway. The Mennonite tradition still lingers in the peaceful valley producing a population with enduring values.

In the 1950s many Austrian and German immigrants were sponsored by Black Creek Mennonites, and much of the life of the community was conducted in a mixture of German and English well into the 1960s. The conservative and church-oriented community contributed significantly to the musical and academic life of the Comox Valley, especially the high schools.

Today, Black Creek still retains two Mennonite churches (United Mennonite and Mennonite Brethren), though only a few of the original families still live in the area.

Climate 
Black creek has an oceanic climate because the driest month has just enough rainfall to avoid the warm summer Mediterranean Climate.

References

External links
 Black Creek

Populated places on the British Columbia Coast
Unincorporated settlements in British Columbia
Populated places in the Comox Valley Regional District
Mennonitism in British Columbia